Viburnum australe, known by the common name Mexican arrowwood, is a woody plant in the family Adoxaceae (previously Caprifoliaceae).  It is found in northeastern Mexico and western Texas.

Description
Viburnum australe grows as a deciduous, multi-stemmed shrub, reaching  in height.

Distribution and habitat
Viburnum australe is native to the Sierra Madre Oriental in the Mexican states of Coahuila and Nuevo Léon. It also occurs in the United States in the Davis Mountains of Texas. V. australe inhabits mesic pine-oak forests above .

Taxonomy and evolution
The generic name originated in Latin, where it referred to V. lantana. The specific epithet australe is derived from Latin australis, meaning "southern" (c.f. Australia).

Viburnum australe was described as a separate species by Conrad Vernon Morton in 1933, from a specimen collected in 1906 by Cyrus Guernsey Pringle. Subsequent taxonomists subsumed V. australe into Viburnum affine C.K.Schneid., which is itself considered a midwestern variety of Viburnum rafinesqueanum Schult. However, recent molecular phylogenetic work has revealed that V. australe is actually more closely related to V. ellipticum, from the Pacific Coast Ranges of the western United States, than it is to V. rafinesqueanum. V. australe would therefore be considered a distinct species under the phylogenetic species concept.

Viburnum australe and V. ellipticum are closely related to three species from eastern North America: V. rafinesqueanum, V. molle, and the endangered V. bracteatum. These species, known as clade Mollodontotinus, are in turn more distantly related to the arrowwood species complex and its Neotropical relatives in clade Oreinodontotinus.

Conservation
Viburnum australe is considered to be a rare species in the United States, where it is known from a single locality near the town of Madera Springs, Texas.

Like other species in clades Mollodontotinus and Oreinodontotinus, Viburnum australe is vulnerable to Pyrrhalta viburni, an invasive Eurasian leaf beetle. North American Viburnum, which did not coevolve with P. viburni, lack the physiological defenses that allow its Eurasian relatives to fend off beetle infestations, and have therefore been decimated in areas where P. viburni has become established.

References

External links
 Holotype of Viburnum australe at the JSTOR Global Plants virtual herbarium.

australe
Flora of Northeastern Mexico
Flora of the Sierra Madre Oriental
Flora of Texas